Nerlerit Inaat Airport  is an airport in the Sermersooq municipality in eastern Greenland. The airport can serve STOL aircraft. An AS 350 helicopter of Air Greenland is permanently housed at the airport, linking it with Ittoqqortoormiit Heliport. The helicopter also provides search and rescue capabilities within the surrounding area, and can be chartered for transport.

History
The airport was built in 1985 by the US oil company ARCO in connection with oil exploration in Jameson Land. It was sold to Greenland in 1990.

In summer 2004 the airport was the destination of an arctic trip by two German microlight pilots flying a Flight Design CT2K light aircraft.

The airport may be relocated to a new site on Liverpool Land closer to Ittoqqortoormiit, between the settlement and Uunarteq cape to the south, thus eliminating the need for helicopter transfers.

Operations
The airport has around 15 employees, who have their home within the airport area. No other settlement is reachable by road, making the airport possibly the one with smallest population reachable by road in the world. There is a road to a seaport around 2 km south of the terminal building, and some other roads in the area. Transportation to the main settlement in the area (Ittoqqortoormiit) is by helicopter or (in the summer) by boat.

The airport acts as stopping off point for a number of expeditions into Jameson Land and Northeast Greenland National Park. Areas such as Renland have only just been visited, or have had no known visitors.

Airlines and destinations

References

Airports in Greenland
Airports in the Arctic